Shelter Me is the second album by Australian folk band The Waifs, first released by Jarrah in March 1998.

Track listing
"Heart Lies" (Cunningham) – 2:43
"People Who Think They Can" (V. Simpson) – 3:15
"Shelter Me" (Cunningham) – 3:05
"Lest We Forget" (Cunningham) – 4:54
"Smith St" (D. Simpson, Cunningham) – 3:40
"Time To Part" (V. Simpson) – 4:04
"Sound The Alarm" (Cunningham) – 3:37
"Stuck" (V. Simpson, Cunningham) – 4:01
"The River" (Cunningham) – 3:20
"Spotlight" (V. Simpson) – 5:51
"Attention" (Cunningham) – 2:31
"Bonus Track – Billy Jones (Jazz Version)" – 3:29

Release and re-release
Much like The Waifs' debut album, Shelter Me was originally released in 1998 on Outside Music, but following the mainstream success of The Waifs, the album was re-released on Jarrah Records of Australia in 2003, and Compass Records of America in 2004.

Personnel

The Waifs
Josh Cunningham – guitar (acoustic), mandolin, guitar (electric)
Donna Simpson – guitar, percussion, vocals
Vikki Simpson – guitar, harmonica, vocals

Additional musicians
Jen Anderson – violin, viola
Jeff Algra – percussion, drums
Ashley Davies – drums
Andrew Entsch – double bass

Technical
Don Bartley – mastering
The Waifs – producer, design, photography
Graham Fraser – engineer
Adam Rhodes – engineer

Musical/technical
Chris Dickie - percussion, engineer, mixing

References

1998 albums
The Waifs albums